Hardhat and Legs is a 1980 American made-for-television comedy-drama film starring Kevin Dobson and Sharon Gless. It was written by Garson Kanin and Ruth Gordon, their first collaboration since The Marrying Kind.

Cast
Kevin Dobson as Sal Pacheco
Sharon Gless as Patricia Botsford
Raymond Serra as Vinnie
Charlie Aiken as Bud Botsford
Elva Josephson as Deedee Botsford
Jacqueline Brookes	as Stella Botsford
W.T. Martin as William Botsford
Bobby Short as Himself

References

External links

1980 television films
1980 films
1980 comedy-drama films
American comedy-drama television films
CBS network films
Films directed by Lee Philips
Films scored by Brad Fiedel
1980s English-language films
1980s American films